Karwan-e-Zindagi is a voluminous autobiography of Abul Hasan Ali Hasani Nadwi in Seven volumes which is a contribution to the history as well as to Urdu literature. Originally, the book was written in Urdu.

Contents 
In this work, Nadwi tried to cover all the information related to himself as well as the remarkable events of his life. His motivation for writing his autobiography is not merely to recount memorable milestones in his life but to provide an all-encompassing spectrum of his activities that delineates his intellectual growth and development. The historical incidents in his life are contextualized to provide the reader an opportunity to examine his role in the said events, in which Nadwi was an active participant. Furthermore, his autobiography makes copious reference to his prolific writings to highlight his contribution to contemporary Islamic thought. The book also attempts to explore Nadwi's vision and thought regarding Islam and humanity as well as what was his attitude for the renaissance of Islam in the modern age. He stated in his autobiography that, he believed in steadfastness, progress, to make use of everything old which is beneficial, welcomed everything new which is sound, adopted from tradition what is sincere and rejected what is dubious. Its represents his synopsis of his other important works, which analyzed for a more complete appreciation of his contribution to contemporary Islamic thought.

Reception 
Regarding the book, Muhiuddin Khan said,

References

External links 

1983 non-fiction books
Indian books
History of Islam
Books by Abul Hasan Ali Hasani Nadwi
Deobandi literature
1983 books
History of India
Islam in India
Autobiographies